= Sonahita =

Sonahita is a village in Garwara, Uttar Pradesh, India.
